The Shiloh House is a historic house on Cliff Road in Sulphur Springs, Benton County, Arkansas.  Built in 1927, it is one of the largest examples of Bungalow-style architecture in Benton County.  Set on a steeply sloping lot above Cliff Road, it is two stories at the front and three at the back, with a broad single-story porch which extends over a carport to the right.  The porch is supported by supports that are a combination of brick piers and boxed columns, joined by a brick balustrade.

The house was listed on the National Register of Historic Places in 1988.

See also
National Register of Historic Places listings in Benton County, Arkansas

References

Houses on the National Register of Historic Places in Arkansas
Houses completed in 1927
Houses in Benton County, Arkansas
National Register of Historic Places in Benton County, Arkansas
1927 establishments in Arkansas
American Craftsman architecture in Arkansas
Bungalow architecture in Arkansas